San Luca is a comune (municipality) in the Province of Reggio Calabria in the Italian region Calabria, located about  southwest of Catanzaro and about  east of Reggio Calabria. The town is situated on the eastern slopes of the Aspromonte mountain, in the valley of the Bonamico river.

The Italian author Corrado Alvaro was born in San Luca in 1895. His hand-written notes and other personal belongings are now kept in the house where he was born by the Corrado Alvaro Foundation.

History
San Luca was founded on October 18, 1592, by the Prince Sigismund Loffredo and named after the saint of that particular day, Luke the Evangelist, who became the patron saint of the town. It was populated by refugees from the old town of Potamia, which was destroyed by landslides. San Luca became a comune in 1811, and was hit by floods and landslides in 1951, 1953 and December 1972.

Around 1900, at the time the young Corrado Alvaro grew up in San Luca, illiteracy was near 100 percent and the town had no drinking water. The women went to fetch water with the casks on their heads at a well nearby. The town was pretty much isolated; there was no road to the coast and the only way to get there was on foot. Many inhabitants joined the Italian diaspora to escape the extreme poverty.

Stronghold of the 'Ndrangheta
San Luca is considered to be the stronghold of the 'Ndrangheta, a Mafia-type criminal organisation based in Calabria. According to a former  'ndranghetista, "almost all the male inhabitants belong to the 'Ndrangheta, and the Sanctuary of Our Lady of Polsi has long been the meeting place of the affiliates, known as the Crimine." At least since the 1950s, the chiefs of the 'Ndrangheta locali have met regularly near the Sanctuary of Our Lady of Polsi during the September Feast. In 1969 the police raided a meeting near the sanctuary and captured more than 70  'ndranghetisti, while others managed to escape.

The historical preeminence of the San Luca family is such that every new group or locale must obtain its authorization to operate and every group belonging to the 'Ndrangheta "still has to deposit a small percentage of illicit proceeds to the principale of San Luca in recognition of the latter’s primordial supremacy." San Luca, in the words of a study published in 2005 by Italy's domestic intelligence service, is "the cradle of [the 'Ndrangheta] and its epicentre".

The San Luca feud, a war between the two 'Ndrangheta clans Pelle-Vottari-Romeo and Strangio-Nirta from San Luca that had started in 1991 and resulted in several deaths carried into Germany in 2007; six men were shot to death in front of an Italian restaurant in Duisburg on 15 August 2007.

Demographic evolution

Notable people
 Corrado Alvaro (1895–1956), journalist and writer
 Antonio Pelle (1932–2009), also known as Ntoni Gambazza, a historically significant 'Ndrangheta boss
 Antonio Nirta (1919–2015),  a historically significant 'Ndrangheta boss

References

External links
All In The Famiglia: Cracking omertà in Calabria, by Bruce Livesey, The Walrus Magazine, May 2008.

Cities and towns in Calabria
History of the 'Ndrangheta